Tell Schirnding Berna (July 24, 1891 – April 5, 1975) was an American middle-distance and long-distance runner.

His 1912 American record at two miles stood for twenty years. He competed for the United States in the 1912 Summer Olympics held in Stockholm, Sweden in the 3000 metre team where he won the gold medal with his team mates Norman Taber and George Bonhag. He also finished fifth in the individual 5000 meters.

Berna graduated from Cornell University in 1912 and was a member of the Sphinx Head Society. After college, Berna had a career in the machine tool industry; in 1937 he became general secretary of the National Machine Tools Business Association, and he served in that post through World War II. He was serving as general manager of the organization in 1950 when he contributed an article to American Affairs.

References

American male long-distance runners
Athletes (track and field) at the 1912 Summer Olympics
Cornell University alumni
Olympic gold medalists for the United States in track and field
1891 births
1975 deaths
People from Pelham Manor, New York
Medalists at the 1912 Summer Olympics
Olympic cross country runners